The Abrahamskraal Formation is a geological formation and is found in numerous localities in the Northern Cape, Western Cape, and the Eastern Cape of South Africa. It is the lowermost formation of the Adelaide Subgroup of the Beaufort Group, a major geological group that forms part of the greater Karoo Supergroup. It represents the first fully terrestrial geological deposits of the Karoo Basin. Outcrops of the Abrahamskraal Formation are found from the small town Middelpos in its westernmost localities, then around Sutherland, the Moordenaarskaroo north of Laingsburg, Williston, Fraserburg, Leeu-Gamka, Loxton, and Victoria West in the Western Cape and Northern Cape. In the Eastern Cape outcrops are known from Rietbron, north of Klipplaat and Grahamstown, and also southwest of East London.

Geology 
The Abrahamskraal Formation comprises the majority of the Middle Permian Beaufort sequence, and are thought to range between 268 - 259 million years in age. The lowermost deposits of the Abrahamskraal Formation found in the Eastern Cape until recently were named the Koonap Formation, but these outcrops have been amalgamated into the Abrahamskraal Formation due to recent stratigraphic and biostratigraphic research. The Abrahamskraal Formation incorporates the entire Tapinocephalus Assemblage Zone in its upper sections and the entire Eodicynodon Assemblage Zone its lowermost southern deposits. In the west and northerly deposits the Abrahamskraal Formation overlies the Waterford Formation and the Middleton Formation in the south, both formations containing the uppermost deposits of the Ecca Group.

The rocks of the Abrahamskraal Formation comprise mainly greenish-grey to blueish-grey mudstone coupled with rarer instances of greyish-red, reddish-brown or purple mudstones. These include subordinate greenish-grey, fine-grained sandstones which are normally observed in fining upward cycles. The sandstones vary in thickness from several metres to several tens of metres in some localities. Siltstones are also found interbedded with the mudstone beds. The presence of these rocks reveal much about the past environment that they were deposited in. They were formed by sedimentary material being deposited in the Karoo Basin - a retro-arc foreland basin - by vast, low-energy alluvial plains flowing northwards from the south. The lowermost deposits are considered to be deltaic and grade laterally into the underlying Ecca Group deposits in its southern localities. Deposits grade steadily younger in the northeast where the sedimentary facies turn fully terrestrial. The greenish-grey mudstones are usually associated with the deltaic sedimentary facies while the redder mudstones with the terrestrial.

All sedimentary rocks of the Karoo Basin were transported downhill from the south in the shadow of the rising Gondwanide mountain range. The Gondwanides were the result of tectonic uplift that had previously begun to take course due to subduction of the Palaeo-pacific plate beneath the Gondwanan Plate. Orogenic pulses from the growing Gondwanides mountain chain and associated subduction created accommodation space for sedimentation in the Karoo Basin where the deposits of the Abrahamskraal Formation and all succeeding deposits of the Karoo Basin were deposited over millions of years.

Paleontological significance 
The Abrahamskraal Formation is highly fossiliferous and well known for its biozone assemblages of therapsid fossils. The Eodicynodon and Tapinocephalus Assemblage Zones to which this geological formation incorporates preserve the first appearance of the earliest dicynodonts, dinocephalians, biarmosuchians, therocephalians, gorgonopsians, and pareiasaurian parareptiles. The upper sections of this formation document the rise of and diversification of the dinocephalians. The dinocephalians subsequently went extinct at the contact of the Abrahamskraal Formation with the overlying Teekloof Formation. The basal pelycosaur synapsid species, Elliotsmithia longiceps, has also been found in the deposits of this formation. The presence of this basal synapsid is indicative of this geological formations significance. For decades, paleontologists have puzzled over what has been termed Olsen’s Gap, which is used to describe the evolutionary gap in the tetrapod fossil record between the appearance of the more derived therapsids and their ancestors, the pelycosaurs. The rocks of the Abrahamskraal Formation and its geological correlates abroad hold the promise of that fossil gap being bridged through future research endeavors in the years to come. More notable fossil species includes the dicynodont Diictodon feliceps which first appears in the upper sections of this formation, remaining ubiquitous until the Permian-Triassic boundary. Finally, fossils of temnospondyl amphibians such as of Rhinesuchus, the fish Namaichthys, invertebrate fossils of molluscs, invertebrate trackways and burrows, vertebrate footprints of therapsids, and a variety of plant fossils such as Dadoxylon, Equisetum modderdriftensis, Schizoneura africana, and several different species of Glossopteris have been recovered.

Among the species found in the Abrahamskraal Formation is Moschops Capensis

Correlation 
The Abrahamskraal Formation corresponds with numerous localities abroad. Currently it is considered to correlate chronostratigraphically with the Rio do Rasto Formation from the Paraná Basin in Brazil, the Madumabisa Mudstone Formation of Zambia, the Ocher and Isheevo faunas of Russia, and to the Dashankou fauna from the Xidagou Formation of China. However, correlative dating between the Xidagou Formation and the Abrahamskraal Formation remains inconsistent and needs further study.

References 

Geologic formations of South Africa
Permian System of Africa
Permian South Africa
Guadalupian
Sandstone formations
Shale formations
Deltaic deposits
Permian southern paleotemperate deposits
Beaufort Group
Formations
Formations
Formations